Nadine Burgos Eidloth-Chua (born 2 March 1988), known professionally as Nadine Samonte, is a Filipino-German actress and model. She participated as an Avenger of the first season of StarStruck.

Career
Samonte first ventured into show business when she auditioned and became part of ABS-CBN Talent Center's Star Circle Batch 10 in 2001. She later auditioned for first batch of the talent search StarStruck. She appeared in the third season of Love to Love as well as in the series Kissing Beauty. She followed this with the role of Sophia in the afternoon daily soap Ikaw Sa Puso Ko. Samonte later starred in Leya, Ang Pinakamagandang Babae Sa Ilalim Ng Lupa (Leya: The Most Beautiful Woman Underground).

She received the "Most Promising Actress" award from the Guillermo Mendoza Memorial Scholarship Foundation.

She was included in the second installment of GMA's seasonal afternoon soap, Now and Forever with their plot entitled Ganti (Revenge).  Then, she made another film teen-romance flick, Say That You Love Me. She was also included in the comedy film, Hari ng Sablay.

She then acted in the television series Etheria and the movie Isusumbong Kita sa Kuya Ko, which was an official entry to the Metro Manila Film Festival. She starred in Bakekang as Lorraine. Samonte which was followed by a role in Super Twins. Then, she was then chosen to reprise the role of Hilda Koronel in the TV remake of Kung Mahawi Man Ang Ulap. She starred in the TV remake of Maging Akin Ka Lamang where she reprised the role of Dina Bonnevie.

In Ako si Kim Samsoon, a Koreanovela remake based on My Lovely Sam Soon, she plays Hannah. She followed with roles in Carlo J. Caparas' Gagambino, SRO Cinemaserye: Suspetsa and Darna (2009 version). Samonte also appears in the Sine Novela, Tinik Sa Dibdib where she played the new Lorna Yadao-Domingo or Danica.

In 2010, she became part of the cast of the Koreanovela remake Endless Love (based on Autumn in My Heart) as Shirley originally by South Korean actress Han Chae-young the main antagonist to lead stars Dingdong Dantes, Marian Rivera and Dennis Trillo. She also followed up in special participation roles in Bantatay and Koreana.

In 2011, she starred in the suspense-drama series My Lover, My Wife where she played the main antagonist but later the show did not renewed into second season. On 13 July 2011 TV5 announced that she will be joining on their upcoming television pilot playing the lead role.

She is now a freelance artist. In October 2014 she declared she is open to any network.

Personal life
Samonte has been married to businessman Richard Chua since 30 October 2013; they had initially kept their marriage private until their first wedding anniversary with Samonte explaining they just wanted to have their privacy as a newly wed couple. In June 2016, it was announced that the couple were expecting their first child. Heather Sloane, their daughter, was born on 27 August 2016.

Nadine has German ancestry from her father.

Filmography

Television

Movies

Awards
 Guillermo Mendoza Memorial Scholarship Foundation Awardee (2004) – Most Promising Female Artist

References

External links

1988 births
Living people
Filipino child actresses
Filipino female models
Filipino television actresses
People from Laguna (province)
Participants in Philippine reality television series
StarStruck (Philippine TV series) participants
GMA Network personalities
TV5 (Philippine TV network) personalities
ABS-CBN personalities
Star Magic
Viva Artists Agency
German people of Filipino descent